Hesher may refer to:

 Fan of heavy metal subculture
 Hesher (film), a 2010 drama film starring Joseph Gordon-Levitt
 Hesher (EP), a 1996 EP album by Nickelback